Sally Bazely (born 1933) is a British television actress.

Her main roles were in Father, Dear Father (1968–70) and Harriet's Back in Town (1972). She also played Norman Wisdom's wife in the comedy film What's Good for the Goose (1969), and portrayed Poppaea in the 1976 BBC TV series I, Claudius.

References

External links 

British television actresses
1933 births
Living people
Place of birth missing (living people)